Franklin, Pennsylvania may refer to:

 Franklin, Venango County, Pennsylvania
 Franklin County, Pennsylvania
 Franklin borough, Cambria County, Pennsylvania
 Franklin Park, Pennsylvania
 Franklintown, Pennsylvania

Franklin Township, Pennsylvania may refer to:

 Franklin Township, Adams County, Pennsylvania
 Franklin Township, Beaver County, Pennsylvania
 Franklin Township, Bradford County, Pennsylvania
 Franklin Township, Butler County, Pennsylvania
 Franklin Township, Carbon County, Pennsylvania
 Franklin Township, Chester County, Pennsylvania
 Franklin Township, Columbia County, Pennsylvania
 Franklin Township, Erie County, Pennsylvania
 Franklin Township, Fayette County, Pennsylvania
 Franklin Township, Greene County, Pennsylvania
 Franklin Township, Huntingdon County, Pennsylvania
 Franklin Township, Luzerne County, Pennsylvania
 Franklin Township, Lycoming County, Pennsylvania
 Franklin Township, Snyder County, Pennsylvania
 Franklin Township, Susquehanna County, Pennsylvania
 Franklin Township, York County, Pennsylvania

See also
 East Franklin Township, Pennsylvania
 North Franklin Township, Pennsylvania
 South Franklin Township, Pennsylvania
 West Franklin Township, Pennsylvania